Knightsbridge may refer to several different things.

Places
One of two areas in England:
 Knightsbridge, a street and district in London, including
 Knightsbridge tube station, a London Underground station, or;
 the hamlet of Knightsbridge, Gloucestershire.

Three sites significant in military history:
 Knightsbridge War Cemetery (Libya) – established north of the town of Acroma (Akramah) following World World War II, and named after
 Knightsbridge – the Allied codename for an intersection south of Acroma, which became the focus of the Battle of Knightsbridge (1942).

Other places:
 Knightsbridge, an estate/subdivision in Castle Hill, Sydney, Australia
 The Knightsbridge Residences, a high-end residential skyscraper in Manila, Philippines, or;
 Knightsbridge University, an unaccredited institution in Denmark.

Other things
 Knightsbridge International, a US-based non-government organization or;
 The third movement of the London Suite by Eric Coates.

See also 
 Knightbridge Professor of Philosophy